21 Sarfarosh - Saragarhi 1897 is an Indian historical drama television series starring Mohit Raina, Prakhar Shukla and Mukul Dev. The show is based on the Battle of Saragarhi, fought between Sikh soldiers of the British Indian Army and Pashtun Orakzai tribesmen. Produced by Contiloe Entertainment, it ran from 12 February to 11 May 2018, on Discovery Jeet.

Netflix acquired the international broadcast rights of the series for 190 Countries.

Plot Summary 
The series presents a fictionalized depiction of the events leading up to the final battle between the Orakzais and the 36 Sikh Regiment.

Cast

 Mohit Raina as Havildar Ishar Singh, who leads all the Sikhs in the regiment
 Mukul Dev as Gul Badshah, Leader of the Orakzais
 Alexx O'Nell as Captain Winston Churchill, an Officer on Special Duty who introduces the Heliograph to the regiment
 Prakhar Shukla as Lance Naik Chanda Singh
 Gaurav Vasudev as Officer Watson
 Shakku Rana as Mahmudullah, a leader of another tribe of Orazkzais, who joins Gul Badshah
 Balraj Singh Khehra as Sepoy Buta Singh, one of Ishar's most trusted men
 Sascha Maximus as Colonel John Haughton, commanding officer of Fort Gulistan
 Luke Kenny as Major Des Voeux, commanding officer of Fort Lockhart
 Danny Sura as Captain Henry Mayne, who seems to show hatred and racism to the Sikhs
 Bhawsheel Singh Sahni as Sepoy Gurmukh Singh, youngest soldier and Teresa's love interest
 Vikram Mastal (Sharma) as Sepoy Balwinder Singh, a wrestler who opposes Ishar and becomes a soldier
 Jaspal Sehgal as Sepoy Bhagwan Singh, who runs an orphanage
 Pippa Hughes as Teresa, a maid in the fort who is in love with Gurmukh
Sameksha as Sohni, Ishar Singh's wife
 Kamaljeet Rana as Sepoy Sunder Singh
 Rahul Ranaa as Sepoy Kala singh
 Jashan Singh Kohli as Sepoy Hira Singh, who has special affection towards Seymour
 Bobby Gill as Sepoy Narayan Singh, Ram Singh's older brother
 Rishina Kandhari as Begum, Gul Badshah's wife
 Suzanne Bernert as Queen Victoria in a special Appearance

Awards 
Indian Television Academy Awards

 2018 - Best Actor (Drama) - Mohit Raina

Indian Telly Awards

 2019 - Best Actor (Jury) - Mohit Raina
 2019 Best Actor in a Negative Role(Jury)-Mukul Dev

References

External links
 

Discovery Jeet original programming
Indian drama television series
Hindi-language television shows
2018 Indian television series debuts
2018 Indian television series endings
Television series set in the 1890s
Indian period television series
Indian historical television series
War television series
Television series based on actual events
Indian military television series
Television shows set in Afghanistan
Television shows set in the British Raj
Sikhism in fiction